Saint-Bardoux is a commune in the Drôme department in southeastern France.

Location
Saint-Bardoux is located 8 km north-west of Romans-sur-Isère (capital of the canton) and 11 km east of Tain-l'Hermitage. The surrounding communities are Clérieux, Saint-Donat-sur-l'Herbasse and Granges-les-Beaumont.

Population

See also
Communes of the Drôme department

References

Communes of Drôme